The Magdiwang was a chapter of the Katipunan,  a Philippine revolutionary organization founded by Filipino rebels in Manila in 1892, with the aim to gain independence from Spain. The Magdiwang Council was acknowledged "as 
the supreme organ responsible for the successful campaigns against the enemy" within Cavite.

The Magdiwang chapter was started by Mariano Álvarez, related by marriage to Andrés Bonifacio, the leader of the Katipunan. Both the Magdiwang and the Magdalo (led by Baldomero Aguinaldo, the cousin of Emilio Aguinaldo) were the two major Katipunan factions in Cavite, with the Magdiwang having control over a larger number of towns and municipalities.

When rivalry grew between the two factions, Bonifacio was invited to mediate, but he was quickly embroiled in discussions with the Magdalo, who wished to replace the Katipunan with an insurgent government. The Magdiwang initially backed Bonifacio's stance that the Katipunan already served as their government, but at the Tejeros Convention, both factions were combined into one government body under Aguinaldo.

Magdiwang leaders 
 Lorenzo Fenoy - Vice President for Batangas
 Pascual Álvarez - Minister of the Interior
 Ariston Villanueva - Minister of War
 Ananias Diokno - Vice Minister of War of Batangas
 Mariano Trías  - Minister of Welfare and Justice
 Emiliano Riego de Dios - Minister of Economic Development
 Diego Mojica - Minister of Finance
 Santiago V. Álvarez - Captain General
 Artemio Ricarte - Assistant Captain General
 Miguel Malvar - Assistant Captain General for Batangas
 Mariano Riego de Dios - General, Cavite Division
 Paciano Rizal - General, Batangas Division

Magdiwang municipalities

 Cavite City (capital)
 San Roque
 La Caridad
 Noveleta
 San Francisco de Malabon (now General Trias)
 Rosario (locally referred to as Salinas)
 Sta. Cruz de Malabon (now Tanza)
 Naik
 Maragondon
 Ternate
 Magallanes
 Bailen (now General Emilio Aguinaldo)
 Indang
 Alfonso
 Mendez
 Amadeo
 Nasugbu, Batangas
 Tuy, Batangas
 Looc, Batangas

See also 
Philippine Revolution
First Philippine Republic

References

Further reading
 

Rebel groups in the Philippines
Katipunan
History of Cavite